Cyril Buraman is a Nauruan political figure and member of the Parliament of Nauru.

Background

Buraman stood for, and was duly elected to, the Parliament of Nauru, where the party system is not fully developed, and in 2007 was seen as an opponent of the incoming Administration of President Marcus Stephen.

Events of 2008

Alliance with Parliamentary Speaker

In March 2008 David Adeang was appointed Speaker of the Parliament of Nauru and Buraman was regarded as tactically close to Adeang and to former President of Nauru René Harris, who was at the time still retained his Parliamentary seat and exercised a role as a leading member of the Opposition.

April 2008

In April 2008 Buraman stood again, but lost his seat in the Parliament of Nauru, as did former President René Harris.

Return to Parliament
In June 2013 Buraman was re-elected to Parliament for Anetan. He was the Speaker of the Parliament of Nauru from 13 July 2016 to 27 July 2019.

Having been unseated in the 2019 Parliamentary election, Buraman stood unsuccessfully to regain his Anetan seat in 2022.

See also

 2008 Nauruan parliamentary election
 Politics of Nauru

References

Speakers of the Parliament of Nauru
Members of the Parliament of Nauru
Living people
Year of birth missing (living people)
21st-century Nauruan politicians